The 2019–20 Adelaide Lightning season is the 28th season for the franchise in the Women's National Basketball League (WNBL).

Roster

Standings

Results

Pre-season

Regular season

Finals

Semi-finals

Awards

In-season

Post-season

Club Awards

References

External links
Adelaide Lightning Official website

2019–20 WNBL season
WNBL seasons by team
2019–20 in Australian basketball
Basketball,Adelaide Lightning
Basketball,Adelaide Lightning